The Players Band is an American 9-piece ska band formed in Baltimore in 1999.  The band's musical style combines Jamaican ska, rock, and reggae, and is characterized by the use of upbeat horns and percussion.  The band has performed over 500 live shows in various states, including; Maryland, Pennsylvania, Washington, DC, New York, Delaware, New Jersey, Long Island, Vermont, and Virginia. The Players Band has performed with acts such as Grammy Award Winner The Isley Brothers, Grammy Award Winner Toots & the Maytals, The B-52's, The Mighty Mighty Bosstones, Joe Strummer, Matisyahu, The English Beat, Third Eye Blind, Citizen Cope, Fishbone, The Toasters, The Skatalites, Reel Big Fish, The Pietasters, The Aggrolites, The Slackers, Rebirth Brass Band, Big D and the Kids Table, The Know How, King Django, The Scofflaws, Westbound Train, Eastern Standard Time, Junkyard Band and many others. Notable ska musicians who have performed on stage with The Players Band as guests include; Adam Birch (The Specials), Jeff Richey (The Toasters), Buford O’Sullivan (The Scofflaws), Vinny Noble (Pilfers & Bim Skala Bim), Dr. Ring-Ding, Morgan Russell (Eastern Standard Time) and H.R. (Bad Brains).

Discography

Studio albums
Instrumental - 2001
Hate the Game - 2003, Victor Rice mixed 'Mama' & 'Rub A Dub'.
Half-Time - 2005
Live & Direct - 2008
Skamörgåsbord - 2020, mixed by Victor Rice.

Compilations
D.C-ENE - 2001 on PGU Records
Make It Happen – 2001 on Big Touchin’ Productions
Oasis Alternative - 2002 on Oasis
Still Standing - 2003 by Jump Up Records and Megalith Records Still Standing (ska compilation)
Stubborn Records Sampler - 2005 on Stubborn Records
The Way Things Used to Be Vol. 1 - 2020 on Bob Records

Band members
Dan Schneider - guitar/vocals - (Current member of The Pietasters)
Nick Reider – trumpet - (Current member of Jah Works, touring member of Bumpin Uglies)
David Saunier – sax
Michael Gorman - bari sax
Paul Ackerman aka “Pablo Fiasco” - keys – (Current member of Left Alone, H.R. and the Dubb Agents, Bad Manners, and formerly of The Pietasters, Stubborn All-Stars, and Skinnerbox.)
Joe Ross - bass - (Current member of The Pietasters)
Andy Schneider - drums
Mark Leary - vocals/percussion
Kristin "Lady Hatchet" Forbes - bass/guitar (Touring member of The Slackers)
Marc Levine - percussion

Notable press
Lynn Strader, T. (2019). "Summer fun with Jamaican Ska music." The Journal. 
Conlin, B. (2012). "Frederick Road Fridays adds sounds of Appalachia and Caribbean." The Baltimore Sun.
The Associated Press (2008). "Performers announced for Phelps celebration." The Associated Press.
Campbell, E. (2008). "The Players Band goes live." The Baltimore Examiner.
Lee, P. (2007). ""Players Band" Performs At New Year's Spectacular." WJZ-TV, CBS Broadcasting Inc.
Baylor, A. (2007). “Soundcheck, The Players.” The Baltimore Sun.
Campbell, E. (2006). “Group plays benefit for homeless in Catonsville.” The Examiner.
Sattler, D. (2006). “Hungry for help.” The View.
Sattler, D. (2006). “Rock Steady, The Players are playing for big money. But not their own.” The View.
Ames, M. (2006). “Brothers play for homeless.” The Catonsville Times.
Lewis, J. (2006). "The Players Band, Halftime.” Baltimore Magazine.
Unknown. (2006). “The Players Band will rock Alive @ Five event.” Gazette.
Schaffer, S. (2004). “The Players.” The Baltimore Sun.
Wollan, L. (2003). “The Players Band.” Music Monthly.
Lewis, J. (2003). “The Players Band, Hate the Game.” Baltimore Magazine.
Buckley, M. (2003). “The Players Band.” Chesapeake Music Guide.
Unknown. (2003). “The Players.” Viking Remedy Magazine (France).
Trawinski, J. (2003). “Hate the Game' is a jam driven album.” Towson University Towerlight.
Scruggs, S. (2003). “The Players, Hate The Game.” Music Monthly.
Wollan, L. (2001). “The Players, Instrumental.” Music Monthly.
Jones, D. (2001). “The Players, Instrumental.” Rude Roots Magazine.

Notable quotes
"Fantastic!  You guys are tough." Buckwheat Zydeco.
"Your band freaking rocks!" Joe Strummer.
"Those guys are nice, really nice." Angelo Moore
"A rocking big band out of Baltimore and DC, the Players can hit all the styles and are a must-see live!" - AP Magazine (Alternative Press magazine). August, 2003.

Radio play
89.7 FM WTMD, Towson, MD;  Ocean 98.1 WOCM, Ocean City, MD;  Southern FM 88.3, Brighton, Victoria;  106.7 FM The Fan, Washington, DC;  KQBH-LA 101.5 FM, Los Angeles, CA;  97.9 FM 98 Rock, Baltimore, MD;  105.7 FM Live 105.7, Baltimore, MD;  DC 101 FM, Washington, DC:  103.1 FM WRNR, Annapolis, MD:  103.1 FM WAFY, Frederick, MD;  99.1 FM WHFS, Washington, DC;  91.7 FM KVRX, Austin, TX;  88.3 FM WAIF, Cincinnati, OH;  101.9 FM CITR, Vancouver, B.C.;  89.5 FM CIUT, Toronto, ON;  105.3 FM WEBK, Killington, VT;  90.5 FM, Syracuse, NY;  Holland Radio De B.R.T.O. zendt uit via de kabel op 87.5 MHz.

External links
Official site
Facebook site

American ska musical groups